State Road is an unincorporated community located in the Bryan Township of Surry County, North Carolina and part of Edwards III Township in eastern Wilkes County, North Carolina, United States. As of the 2000 census, the State Road postal district (28676) had a total population of 3,047. The community's unique name is derived from its location on U.S. Route 21. Legend has it that when US 21 was first being built, locals constructed a horseshoe pit on the graded road surface. On Sunday afternoons when they got together to pitch horseshoes, they would say "let's go to state road" and the name stuck.

Geography 
State Road is located at 36°17' North, 80°51' West (36.396418 N, 80.89226 W)

The Community is serviced by State Road Vol. Fire Dept. Founded in 1960.

Unincorporated communities in Surry County, North Carolina
Unincorporated communities in North Carolina